Windy is a French racing class doublehanded dinghy created in 1962–64. Until c. 1989, about 1500–2000 were built. About half were sold in Germany. Races are held yearly, mainly in France and Germany. In 2008 new-produced boats are offered again.

There are four variants:
 Standard (1962–69), competition and leisure
 Racing (c. 1969–77), competition and touring
 Racing S (c. 1977–85?), competition
 Racing Super (c. 1985–), competition

External links
 Windy Class France

Dinghies